Helda is a village in Rapla Parish, Rapla County, Estonia. It's located about 8 km northeast of the town of Rapla. It has an area of 545 ha and a population of 43 (as of 1 February 2010).

Between 1991–2017 (until the administrative reform of Estonian municipalities) the village was located in Juuru Parish. Helda village was detached from Hõreda village in 2010.

References

Villages in Rapla County